Božidara Turzonovová has received a number of awards and accolades in recognition of her success in the film industry. As of March 2017, she has accumulated a total of 24 awards out of 28 nominations.

Awards and nominations

Film awards

Banská Bystrica Film Festival Awards

Czech Lion Awards

Film a Divadlo Awards

Television awards

Golden Croc Awards

Golden Loop Awards

Stage awards

Crystal Wing Awards

DOSKY Awards

LitFond Awards

Other honors

See also
 Božidara Turzonovová filmography

References
General
 
 
 
Specific

External links

 Božidara Turzonovová awards at ČFTA
 
 Božidara Turzonovová awards at KinoBox.cz

Turzonovová, Božidara